The Protecting Veil is a late 20th-century classical composition for cello and strings by British composer John Tavener. It was on the short list of nominees for the 1992 Mercury Prize.

Composition history
Completed in 1988, the work was begun in response to a request from cellist Steven Isserlis for a short (10-minute) piece. It soon developed into a more substantial work, and was subsequently commissioned by the BBC for the 1989 Proms season. Like many of Tavener's compositions, this work reflects the composer's Russian Orthodox religious faith. The inspiration for the piece comes from the Orthodox feast of the Protecting Veil of the Mother of God, which commemorates the apparition of Mary the Theotokos in the early 10th Century at the Blachernae Palace church in Constantinople.

Structure
The composition, which has a performance time of approximately 45 minutes, is divided into eight sections, each of which is based on an icon in the life of the Virgin Mary:

The Protecting Veil
The Nativity of the Mother of God
The Annunciation
The Incarnation
The Lament of the Mother of God at the Cross
The Resurrection
The Dormition
The Protecting Veil

The Protecting Veil was the subject of BBC Radio 3's Discovering Music programme in June 2008.

References

External links
Chester Novello page on The Protecting Veil

Compositions by John Tavener
Compositions for cello and orchestra
1988 compositions